"Everyday Sunshine" is a song by the alternative rock band Fishbone from their 1991 album The Reality of My Surroundings. A music video was made that featured the band playing the song first in an industrial underground complex before switching to a field on a sunny day.

Everyday Sunshine: The Story of Fishbone is also the title of a documentary about the band.

Track listing
A Side
 "Everyday Sunshine" - 4:57
 "Fight The Youth" - 5:00
B Side
 "Fight The Youth (Extended Remix)" - 6:38
 "Freddie's Dead (Zeoniq Mix)" - 6:54

Charts

References

External links
 Everyday Sunshine on IMDb

Fishbone songs
1991 singles
1991 songs
Songs written by Angelo Moore
Columbia Records singles
Song recordings produced by David Kahne